Russ Lorenson (born July 5, 1963, birth name Russ Gangloff) is an American singer and actor. Though a stage actor since childhood, Lorenson more recently established a reputation as an interpreter of jazz standards. With a retro crooner style, Lorenson's sound and approach are an amalgam of Broadway, jazz, and pop.

Early years
Born in Upland, Pennsylvania, just outside Philadelphia, Lorenson's career began as a youngster, making his stage debut at the age of seven. He continued singing and acting in the theatre throughout his early school years, moving with his family to San Diego, California when he was nine years old. At Patrick Henry High School he performed and toured with a classical vocal ensemble. He also gained experience as both a choral conductor and composer, winning a young artists' competition in his school district for his composition work.

At 18 years old, he adopted the stage name of "Lorenson", in honor of his teacher and mentor, Loren Salter, who had helped Lorenson develop as a singer and actor throughout his teen years.

After college, he continued his work as a choral conductor and voice coach, working for five years as Associate Conductor of the California Youth Chorale, founded by Salter. He also returned to theatrical performing, appearing in musical productions with San Diego's Diversionary Theatre, Starlight Musical Theatre, and Lyric Opera San Diego.

Career detour
In the late 1990s, Lorenson took a major detour away from life on the boards. He moved to San Francisco to be close to the Silicon Valley scene and began working in start-ups. He traveled extensively in this period, and earned more than he had previously.

Back to the stage
Although continuing in high-tech, Lorenson found himself unfulfilled creatively after around ten years, and began exploring a return to performing. He began appearing with San Francisco's 42nd Street Moon, one of four theatre groups in the U.S. whose mission is to present staged concert revivals of 'lost' musicals from Broadway's Golden Age. He has appeared in their productions of Finian's Rainbow, Minnie's Boys, Cole Porter's Red, Hot & Blue!, and in 2006, he appeared in the company's first foray into opera, with their production of The Golden Apple.

In 2005, Lorenson left the corporate world. With his band, under the musical direction of jazz pianist Kelly Park, Lorenson quickly established a reputation as one of the San Francisco Bay Area's leading interpreters of jazz standards.

Lorenson's first nightclub show, A Little Travelin' Music, was based on his world travel during his corporate career. His debut CD, of the same name, was released in May 2006 on the LML Music label and featured songs from the show and duets with guests Shawn Ryan and Klea Blackhurst. His second CD, What I Want for Christmas, was released in September 2006, and both CDs were included on the Nominating Ballot for the 49th Annual Grammy Awards in the category of "Best Traditional Pop Vocal Album".

Singing style
TalkinBroadway.com stated that Lorenson "has a voice that is reminiscent of some of the great singers like Tony Bennett, Chet Baker and a little of Mel Tormé."  The Los Angeles Times said that he brings "a supple voice and strong sense of characterization to all his songs."

Discography

Selected Theatrical Productions

Awards and achievements
Lorenson was nominated for a 2007 MAC Award (given by the Manhattan Association of Cabarets and Clubs) for New York performances of his show, Benedetto/Blessed: A Tribute to the Life and Music of Tony Bennett.

Sources
Russ Lorenson's official press kit, provided by Arthur Shafman.
LML Music catalogue of recordings.

References

External links
Russ Lorenson official website
LML Music official website

1963 births
Living people
Musicians from Philadelphia
American jazz singers
American male singers
Male actors from Philadelphia
Jazz musicians from Pennsylvania
American male jazz musicians